Sparkling Red Star (Chinese: 闪闪的红星 孩子的天空) is a 2007 Chinese animated film produced by Puzzle Animation Studio Limited in collaboration with the Bayi Film Studio of the People's Liberation Army. It is an animated remake of the 1974 children's propaganda film Sparkling Red Star, which was made during the Cultural Revolution. The film concerns a boy who helps the Red Army fight a greedy landlord in his village.

Story
The story is set in 1937 against the background of the Red Army's Long March. In Liuxi Village in Jiangxi, an innocent and cheerful child, Pan Dongzi (潘东子), spent his carefree childhood. However, after reaching 10 years of age, he began to experience the sorrows and joys of life's partings and reunions.

Pan's father was a Red Army sympathizer. He, along with other villagers, have been partitioning grain harvests out into two sections, one to be handed over to the landlord, the other to be saved for the Red Army, who was due to pass through their village. When Hu Hansan, the tyrannical landlord of the village, found out about this, Pan's father was captured. The Red Guards of the Red Army show up just in time to save Pan's father and since then, Pan worshiped Xiuzhu, the Captain of Red Guards. The villagers of Liuxi Village also enjoyed a period of happy days under the protection of the Red Guards.

However, good times did not last long. The Red Army had to set off on the Long March, and Pan's father went with them. Before father and son parted, Pan's father gave him a red star badge as a symbol of encouragement. After his father left, only a few members of the Red Guard were left stationed in Liuxi Village. Hu the traitor, hired a number of cold-blooded killers and returned to Liuxi Village. He occupied Liuxi Village again, and Pan had no choice but to flee with his mother by following the Red Guards.

Regaining his control over the village, Hu's not only back to his old tricks of bullying the villagers, he also plans on making a profit by buying and selling weapons (presumably to the enemies of the Red Army, though it's not clearly stated). The remaining Red Guards in Liuxi feel this poses a great threat to other Red Guards on the frontlines and decide they need to destroy Hu's radio so he can longer contact his suppliers or buyers. Pan manages to sneak into Hu's quarters and steal the radio but he inadvertently leads Hu and his henchmen to the Red Guard hideout.

A fight between the Red Guards and Hu and his men break out. Pan's mother, joining the Red Guards in fight, is shot and killed. From that time, Pan grew up experiencing failures and frustrations with neither of his parents by his side. Pan constantly strove to become stronger, and gradually became a tough person. He had changed from a stubborn child into a brave and passionate young man.

Production 
The film is a remake of a classic Chinese children's propaganda film of the same name made in 1974. The production cost was more than US$2 million and was a collaboration between the Bayi film studio of the People's Liberation Army and Puzzle Animation Studio Limited, a Shenzhen animation studio led by Hong Kong businessman Chin Yiu-tong. According to Chin, he funded the project because he "wanted to do something for Chinese animation."

The filmmakers did not make the theme as politically revolutionary as the original film, and chose to focus more on family and friendship, although there are still numerous propagandistic elements. The pop duo Twins featured on the Cantonese version of the movie soundtrack.

The animation was mostly hand-drawn and had a running time of 84 minutes. It was released on October 1 in mainland China, and on October 18 in Hong Kong.

Reception and analysis 
Its distribution company, Asia Animation Limited, was awarded a Certificate of Merit in the Best Digital Entertainment (Digital Animation) Award category by the Hong Kong Digital Entertainment Association in 2007.

According to a 2011 paper by Luke Robinson, the remake treats its audience of Chinese children as a consumer and is a commercialized version of the original, which was politically pedagogical in nature and treated the child as a potential political agent.

References

External links
 Official Site

Chinese animated films
2000s Mandarin-language films
2007 films
Films set in 1937
Films directed by Dante Lam